Cinemex is a Mexican chain of cinemas. It operates multiplexes in cities such as Mexico City, Guadalajara, Monterrey, Toluca, Cd. Juarez, Leon, Tijuana, Mexicali, Puebla and other Mexican cities. 

In 2015, Cinemex began to expand into the United States under the banner CMX. It initially focused on cinemas with premium amenities; in 2017, this division expanded via its acquisition of Cobb Theatres, making it the eighth-largest U.S. cinema chain.

History 
Cinemex started with a college business plan. Adolfo Fastlicht, Miguel Angel Dávila Guzmán and Matthew Heyman speculated that Mexico was ready for larger movie theaters. When the regulations were lifted with the new Cinematography Law passed in Mexico in 1992, Adolfo Fastlicht and Miguel Angel Dávila decided that Mexico City offered a market for a high-end chain of theaters.

In 1994, they secured $21.5m in equity financing from JPMorgan Partners and a partnership of the Bluhm family of Chicago, CMex Investors.and some Mexican former politicians  The deal is generally acknowledged to be the largest venture capital start-up in Mexican history.

Cinemex's first theater was Cinemex Altavista and it opened on August 2, 1995; the second was Unicornio Land opened on September 23, 1996,  soon followed by Cinemex Santa Fe, the company's flagship, in October and Cinemex Manacar on January, 1997.  That same year saw the opening of Cinemex Los Reyes and Cinemex Loreto.

In June 2002, Oaktree Capital Management acquired Cinemex for $250 million. Two years later, it was sold to a partnership of The Carlyle Group, Bain Capital and Spectrum.

Cinemex was acquired by MMCinemas, the second-largest movie theater operator in the country, from AMC Entertainment for $315 million in 2008.

In 2013, Cinemex began to offer MX4D screens at selected locations.

In February 2013, Cinemex announced its intent to acquire the Mexican operations of U.S. cinema chain Cinemark. The sale was approved by regulators in November.

In August 2013, Cinemex reached a 10-year agreement to exclusively use RealD equipment at all of its cinemas.

In 2015, Cinemex and competitor Cinépolis were both fined by the Instituto Nacional Electoral for defying an order to cease screening political advertising from the Ecologist Green Party of Mexico. The party was also fined.

U.S. operations 
In 2015, Cinemex announced plans to expand into the United States with premium dine-in cinemas, including a location at American Dream in New Jersey.  In 2016, it opened its first U.S. location under the banner CMX: The VIP Cinema Experience, at Brickell City Centre in Miami. In October 2017, Cinemex announced its intent to acquire Cobb Theatres via the CMX Cinemas subsidiary, which made it the eighth-largest U.S. cinema chain with 30 locations.

On March 16, 2020, CMX agreed to acquire 10 theatres and one under development from Star Cinema Grill. However, its Star Cinema Grill owner Omar Khan filed a lawsuit in April alleging that CMX breached its contract by refusing to close the deal by March 26 because of the COVID-19 pandemic. CMX filed for Chapter 11 bankruptcy protection on April 25 due to the pandemic; CMX shuttered 10 underperforming theatres and was initially unable to renegotiate contracts with creditors such as landlords and movie studios. Following a six-month negotiation with creditors, CMX emerged from bankruptcy in December; landlords agreed to modified revenue-share leases where they will receive part of the theatres' profits.

Locations

References

External links
 
 CMX Cinemas (U.S.)

Cinema chains in Mexico
Companies based in Mexico City
Mass media in Mexico City
Entertainment companies established in 1993
1993 establishments in Mexico
Companies that filed for Chapter 11 bankruptcy in 2020